Sadeh is an Iranian winter festival.

Sadeh may also refer to:

People
Sadeh (queen) (floruit 21st century BCE), ancient Egyptian queen consort
Aliza Sadeh Miss Israel 1965 
Pinchas Sadeh (born Pinchas Feldman, 1929-94), Polish-born Israeli novelist and poet
Yitzhak Sadeh (born Isaac Landsberg, 1890-1952), commander of the Palmach, a founder of the Israel Defense Forces

Places
Mashabei Sadeh, a kibbutz in the Negev desert in Israel
Pe'at Sadeh,  was an Israeli settlement
 Sadeh, Darab, Fars Province, Iran
 Sadeh, Mazandaran, Iran

Awards
The Yitzhak Sadeh Prize for Military Literature, an annual literary award given in Israel

Mythical beings
Adne Sadeh, a legendary beast from Jewish folklore

See also
Sada (disambiguation)
Sadda (disambiguation)